Jablanac Jasenovački was a village that had existed in the vicinity of Jasenovac and near Mlaka in central Croatia, on the left bank of the river Sava. The village population suffered 182 deaths during World War II, and the Ustaše completely depopulated the village in 1942, and used its area for forced labor of inmates of the Jasenovac concentration camp. After the war, few people returned, and because of the Sava flooding, the village was completely disbanded in 1964.

References

Ghost towns in Croatia
History of the Serbs of Croatia
Geography of Sisak-Moslavina County